Stokka Church is a parish church of the Church of Norway in Stavanger Municipality in Rogaland county, Norway. It is located in the Stokka neighborhood in the Eiganes og Våland borough in the city of Stavanger. It is the church for the Stokka parish which is part of the Stavanger domprosti (arch-deanery) in the Diocese of Stavanger. The red brick church was built in a fan-shaped design in 1974 using designs by the architectural firm: Byarkitekten Stavanger. The church seats about 500 people.

See also
List of churches in Rogaland

References

Churches in Stavanger
Brick churches in Norway
20th-century Church of Norway church buildings
Churches completed in 1974
1974 establishments in Norway